Treves is a surname. Notable people with the surname include:

 Abraham ben Solomon Treves (16th century), Italian rabbi
 Alex Treves (1929–2020), Italian-born American fencer
 Claudio Treves (1869–1933), Italian politician, father of Paolo
 Fabio Treves (born 1949), Italian musician
 François Trèves (born 1930), French mathematician
 Sir Frederick Treves, 1st Baronet (1853–1923), British surgeon
 Frederick Treves (actor) (1925–2012), English actor, great-nephew of Sir Frederick, father of Simon
 Naphtali Hirsch Treves (16th century), German kabbalist
 Paolo Treves (1908–1958), Italian politician, son of Claudio
 Renato Treves (1907–1992), Italian sociologist
 Prof. David (Franco) Treves (1930–2016), Italian-born, Israeli renown applied Physics scientist
 Simon Treves (born 1957), English actor, son of Frederick
 Vanni Treves (1940–2019), Italian-British television executive

Jewish surnames
Yiddish-language surnames